Prague Skate was an international figure skating competition organized in Czechoslovakia from October 28 to November 1, 1992. Medals were awarded in the disciplines of men's singles, ladies' singles and pair skating. The event was organized as a test competition for the 1993 World Figure Skating Championships.

Men

Ladies

Pairs

Ice dancing

References
German Figure Skating Magazin "Pirouette" 12/1992

Prague Skate
Prague Skate